Al qunfotha is a small port in Saudi Arabia.  It is located in the Tihamah area about 400 km south of Mecca.  The area was used as a port for pilgrims when any political instability occurs on the normal peligri.

Ports and harbours of Saudi Arabia
Transport in the Arab League

ar:محافظة القنفذة